This list of settlements in Ogle County, Illinois, United States, contains the names of incorporated cities in villages in the county, as well as unincorporated communities.

Current communities

See also
Ogle County, Illinois

Notes

References
NACO Site

Geography of Ogle County, Illinois